Sepp De Roover (born 12 November 1984) is a retired Belgian footballer who played as a right back and current head coach of FC Wezel Sport.

Career

Club career
De Roover played as a defender and was born in Geel. He made his debut in professional football, being part of the FC Eindhoven squad in the 2005–06 season before joining Sparta Rotterdam. In 2008, he signed to play for FC Groningen.

De Roover played for the Belgium national football team at the 2008 Summer Olympics.

On 12 June 2010 it was announced that De Roover will play for SC Lokeren as of the start of the 2010–2011 season. On 5 August 2012 it was announced that De Roover was sent on loan to NAC Breda in the Dutch Eredivisie. He made a permanent transfer to NAC in June 2013.

Coaching career
On 8 January 2020 it was confirmed, that De Roover would become the head coach of FC Wezel Sport.

References

External links
 Voetbal International profile 
 
 
 

1984 births
Living people
People from Geel
Belgian footballers
Belgium under-21 international footballers
FC Eindhoven players
PSV Eindhoven players
Sparta Rotterdam players
FC Groningen players
K.S.C. Lokeren Oost-Vlaanderen players
NAC Breda players
Belgian Pro League players
Challenger Pro League players
Eredivisie players
Eerste Divisie players
Footballers at the 2008 Summer Olympics
Olympic footballers of Belgium
Belgian expatriate sportspeople in the Netherlands
Belgian expatriate footballers
Expatriate footballers in the Netherlands
Association football defenders
Belgium international footballers
Belgian football managers
Footballers from Antwerp Province